Aaron Cecil Snyder (September 14, 1907 – June 29, 1959) was an American lawyer who served as a prosecutor and judge in Puerto Rico.

Early life 
Snyder was born in Baltimore, Maryland. After attending Baltimore City College and Johns Hopkins University as an undergraduate, he graduated from Harvard Law School in 1930.

Snyder practiced law briefly in New York City and Baltimore. In 1933, Maryland Senator Millard Tydings, Chairman of the Senate Committee on Territories, arranged for Snyder's appointment as United States Attorney for the District of Puerto Rico. As U.S. Attorney, he prosecuted Puerto Rican independence activist Pedro Albizu Campos and defended then-Senate President Luis Muñoz Marín at U.S. Senate hearings on Muñoz's allegedly communist leanings.

Supreme Court of Puerto Rico 
In 1942, President Franklin D. Roosevelt appointed Snyder as an Associate Justice of the Supreme Court of Puerto Rico. Snyder became the last non-Puerto Rican appointed to that court. As Associate Justice, he appeared before the United States House of Representatives' Committee on Public Lands in 1950 in support of a bill allowing Puerto Rico to draft a local constitution. The bill was passed, and Snyder contributed to the drafting and translation of the Constitution of Puerto Rico.

In 1953, Governor Luis Muñoz Marín, following a long-standing tradition of appointing the most senior Associate Justice as Chief Justice when a vacancy arose, appointed him Chief Justice of the Supreme Court of Puerto Rico, the first appointment that a Puerto Rican governor made to the court, addressing the nomination to "A. Cecilio Snyder". Snyder actually used the name "Cecilio" when sworn in as Chief Justice.

Resignation 
Four years later, in July 1957, after most of Puerto Rico's legal establishment had lost confidence in Snyder's leadership as Chief Justice, he resigned from the court effective September 15, 1957. He was succeeded as Chief Justice by Associate Justice Jaime Sifre Dávila. After his departure from the court, Snyder practiced law in San Juan, Puerto Rico until his death in 1959.

See also

List of Puerto Ricans
Jewish immigration to Puerto Rico

Sources

La Justicia en sus Manos, by Luis Rafael Rivera, 2007, 

1907 births
1959 deaths
20th-century American Jews
Chief Justices of the Supreme Court of Puerto Rico
Associate Justices of the Supreme Court of Puerto Rico
Johns Hopkins University alumni
Harvard Law School alumni
Baltimore City College alumni
United States Attorneys for the District of Puerto Rico
20th-century American judges